Damnjan Nedić also spelled Damjan Nedić (Osečina, Kolubara District, Serbia, 1772 - Čokešina, Municipality of Loznica, Serbia, 1804) is remembered as a heroic figure along with his brother Gligorije Nedić as well as Damnjan Kotešanin and Panta Damnjanović who with their respective companies of hajduk četas fell in the Battle of Čokešina during Karađorđe's Serbia.

In Serbian history, he is one of three Nedić brothers, two of whom perished at the Battle of Čokešina on Lazarus Saturday in 1804 to a numerically superior Turkish army when they attacked the Serbian monastery where 300 young haiduks met their fate. German historian Leopold von Ranke called it the Serbian Thermopylae. Later, the surviving brother Mihajlo Nedić who was stationed elsewhere during the Battle of Čokešina was killed in another battle in 1809.

A street in Belgrade is named after the two brothers.

References 

1772 births
1804 deaths
Hajduks
People of the First Serbian Uprising
Rebels from the Ottoman Empire